Look at Yourself may refer to:
 Look at Yourself (Uriah Heep album)
 Look at Yourself (Emmure album)
 "Look at Yourself" (song), a 1971 song by Uriah Heep